Canessa is a surname of Italian origin. Notable people with the name include:

Alessio Canessa (born 1999), Italian football player
Julio Canessa (1925–2015), Chilean military and political figure
Julio Canessa (footballer) (born 1958), Uruguayan football player
Marta Canessa (born 1936), Uruguayan historian, academic and writer, as well as former First Lady of Uruguay
Pino Canessa (1907–2001), Italian sports sailor
Roberto Canessa (born 1953), Uruguayan air crash survivor and political figure
Stephen Canessa (born 1980), member of the Massachusetts House of Representatives

Italian-language surnames
Surnames of Chilean origin
Surnames of Uruguayan origin